"Cut Off Time" is a single by American R&B singer Omarion featuring American singer Kat DeLuna. Omarion had recorded a track with Kat DeLuna, which later became added in the soundtrack for the 2007 film Feel the Noise.

Track listings
Digital download
"Cut Off Time" – 3:24
Promo CD
"Cut Off Time" – 3:24
"Cut Off Time" (a cappella) – 3:23
"Cut Off Time" (instrumental) – 3:27

Charts

Release history

References

External links
  Cut Off Time On iTunes
 Video

2007 singles
Epic Records singles
Kat DeLuna songs
Omarion songs
Song recordings produced by Timbaland
Songs written by Keri Hilson
Songs written by Timbaland
Songs written by Ezekiel Lewis
2007 songs
Songs written by Patrick "J. Que" Smith

vi:Dance Bailalo